TV Junkie is a 2006 documentary that chronicles Rick Kirkham's drug addiction.

Production
Its filmmakers, Michael Cain and Matt Radecki, sifted through the video diary footage to piece together the story of Kirkham's life, focusing on the seven years in which he and his family struggled with his addiction to crack cocaine. It was shown at Sundance in 2006. The film was the subject of a lawsuit by his ex-wife Tammie.

Reception
Variety gave the film a middling review, finding the central figure unpleasant and unsympathetic and the production values inevitably low. Film Threat found it "an unbelievably candid glimpse into the contradictions of cocaine addiction", and praised Kirkham's articulate and authentic self-portrait. OutNow.CH found it had a certain fascination beyond what would be expected.

Accolades
It won a Special Jury Prize in Documentary at that year's Sundance Film Festival.

References

External links
 
 Official trailer
 Rotten Tomatoes

2006 films
American documentary films
Documentary films about drug addiction
2006 documentary films
Documentary films about journalists
2000s English-language films
Collage film
Sundance Film Festival award winners
2000s American films